HTV may refer to:

Aerospace 
 Huntsville Regional Airport in Huntsville, Texas, United States
 H-II Transfer Vehicle, a Japanese cargo spacecraft for the International Space Station
 Hypersonic Technology Vehicle, part of DARPA Falcon Project

Television 
 Ha Tay TV, a Vietnamese channel now named HanoiTV2
 Hearst Television, US
 Hellenic TV, a British Greek-language station
 Hiroshima Telecasting, a Japanese station
 HTV (Latin America), a Latin American channel
 Ho Chi Minh City Television, a Vietnamese station
 Hrvatska televizija, the Croatian state broadcaster
 HTV Mostar, a former Croatian-language channel in Bosnia and Herzegovina
 ITV Wales & West, formerly Harlech Television or HTV

Other uses 
 Commerce and Transport Union, a former Austrian trade union
 Heat transfer vinyl
 Hydroxyl tagging velocimetry